Lydell is a surname and given name. Notable people with the surname include:

Surname
Brian Lydell (born 1972), American music supervisor
Dennis Lydell ( 1657–1717), English politician

Given name
Lydell Carr (born 1965), American football player
Lydell Mitchell (born 1949), American football player
Lydell Ross (born 1983), American football player
Lydell Sargeant (born 1987), American football player